California's 42nd district may refer to:

 California's 42nd congressional district
 California's 42nd State Assembly district